Morija is a town in western Lesotho, located 35 kilometres south of the capital, Maseru.  Morija is one of Lesotho's most important historical and cultural sites, known as the Selibeng sa Thuto— the Well-Spring of Learning. It was the site of the first French Protestant mission in Lesotho, founded in 1833. The town also houses the Morija Museum and Archives, well known for supporting research and preserving valuable records and documents of Lesotho's history.

See also
Morija Arts & Cultural Festival
Morija Museum & Archives

References
Fitzpatrick, M., Blond, B., Pitcher, G., Richmond, S., and Warren, M. (2004) South Africa, Lesotho and Swaziland. Footscray, VIC: Lonely Planet.

External links
 Morija, Lesotho Cultural Heart 
morija.co.ls is the official site for the city, covering the festival, museum, tourism, arts & culture, and more

 

Populated places in Maseru District